The 1999 NCAA Division I men's soccer tournament was the 40th organized men's college soccer tournament by the National Collegiate Athletic Association, to determine the top college soccer team in the United States. The Indiana Hoosiers won their fifth national title by defeating the Santa Clara Broncos in the championship game, 1–0. The semifinal matches on December 10, 1999, and the final match on December 12 were played in Charlotte, North Carolina at Ericsson Stadium. All first, second, and third round matches were played at the home field of the higher seeded team.

Seeded Teams

Bracket

Final

References

NCAA Division I Mens Soccer
NCAA Division I Men's Soccer Tournament seasons
NCAA Division I men's soccer tournament
NCAA Division I men's soccer tournament
NCAA Division I men's soccer tournament